Kavindu Ishan is a Sri Lankan international footballer who plays as a midfielder for Air Force in the Sri Lanka Football Premier League.

International career

International goals
Scores and results list Sri Lanka's goal tally first.

References

Sri Lankan footballers
1992 births
Living people
Sri Lanka international footballers
Association football midfielders
Air Force SC players
Sri Lanka Football Premier League players